Kyaswa (1198–1251) was the king of the Pagan dynasty of Burma (Myanmar) from 1235 to 1251. Kyaswa succeeded his father Htilominlo and was even more devout. Kyaswa's reign like his father's was largely peaceful but the depletion of the royal treasury due to large tax-free religious landholdings became more pronounced. The royal treasury was so depleted that Kyaswa had trouble completing a temple. The empire founded by Anawrahta over two centuries earlier was still peaceful but already on its last legs,  unprepared for the internal disorders and external forces that were to come.

Early life
Kyaswa was born to Prince Zeya Theinkha and his wife Eindawthe. An inscription donated by his maternal aunt (younger sister of his mother) states that Kyaswa was born on Monday, 4 May 1198 at 4 o'clock in the morning. The date is two weeks later than 20 April 1198, given by the Zatadawbon Yazawin chronicle.

The table below lists the dates given by the four main chronicles.

Reign
Kyaswa assumed the regnal name "Śrī Tribhuvanāditya Pavarapaṇḍita Dhammarāja" (ၐြီတြိဘုဝနာဒိတျပဝရပဏ္ဍိတဓမ္မရာဇ). Kyaswa's reign, like his father's, was largely peaceful but the depletion of the royal treasury due to large tax-free religious landholdings became more pronounced. The royal treasury was so depleted that Kyaswa had trouble completing a temple. The devout king, unlike predecessors before him, did try to address the issue by reclaiming some of religious land from forest-dwelling monks. However public opinion against any seizure of monastic land forced him to return the land. Frustrated, the king left the administration of the kingdom to his son and his deputies, and spent his time composing religious writings, and giving his patronage only orthodox (Theravada) sects. The forest-dwelling monks neither needed his patronage nor feared his authority. Toward the end of his reign, forest-dwellers were openly offering meat and liquor to their devotees.

The king devoted to scholarship and promoting the dhamma with humanitarian policies. Unlike other Pagan kings, he would not resort to forced labor to build his temples. His Pyathada Temple in Pagan is much smaller than many temples built by his predecessors. In 1249, he issued a series of royal edicts (dated 22 April, 1 May and 6 May 1249) to be put up, carved on stone, in every village of more than 50 houses in the empire:

Kings of the past punished thieves by divers torture, starting with impaling. I desire no such destruction. I consider all my beings as my children, and with compassion to all I speak these words...

Death
The king died sometime between 1249 and 1251, according to the main chronicles. But since his son Uzana died in May 1256 after having reigned for 5 years, Kyaswa most probably died in early 1251 as reported by Zatadawbon Yazawin's horoscopes section. Scholarship provisionally accepts 1251 as the year of his death.

Notes

References

Bibliography
 
 
 
 
 
 
 
 
 
 
 

Pagan dynasty
1198 births
1251 deaths
13th-century Burmese monarchs